The West Dickson Street Commercial Historic District, known as Dickson Street (historically spelled incorrectly as Dixon Street), is an area in downtown Fayetteville, Arkansas just off the University of Arkansas campus. It is lined with multiple bars, restaurants, and shops unique to the area. Many large condo projects are now under construction as well. Dickson Street is home to the Walton Arts Center, and serves as the focal point of the Bikes, Blues, and BBQ bike festival, the third largest bike rally in the nation.

Dickson Street is widely considered one of the two most popular entertainment districts in the state, along with the River Market District in downtown Little Rock.

Eponym
Dickson Street is named for Joseph L. Dickson, who arrived in Fayetteville in the 1840s. The move was in response to his father, Ephraim Dickson, receiving a promotion to United States Land Registrar by President James K. Polk. Dickson first lived on the Fayetteville square before buying a  parcel on the north edge of town, moving himself and his wife to present day Dickson Street. The American Civil War forced the Dicksons to flee to Texas, and their home was used as a field hospital during the Battle of Fayetteville. The Dicksons returned to Fayetteville after the war, but Joseph Dickson died of tuberculosis in 1868.

Street history
Dickson Street was a part of the Arkansas Highway System until the Arkansas State Highway and Transportation Department abandoned the route on April 13, 1955. The designation changed when Highway 16 was rerouted onto Maple Street and Razorback Road.

See also
National Register of Historic Places listings in Washington County, Arkansas

References

External links
 http://www.fayettevillear.com/
 Map of the District

Queen Anne architecture in Arkansas
Neoclassical architecture in Arkansas
Transportation in Washington County, Arkansas
Streets in Arkansas
Tourist attractions in Fayetteville, Arkansas
Historic districts on the National Register of Historic Places in Arkansas
National Register of Historic Places in Fayetteville, Arkansas
Shopping districts and streets in the United States